Elkhorn Road is a major west-east road in the Las Vegas metropolitan area, Nevada, United States.

Route
Elkhorn Road begins at Egan Crest Drive in the northwestern corner of Las Vegas. The road heads east to the Centennial Hills neighborhood where it forms a major intersection with Durango Drive near the RTC park and ride lot. Elkhorn Road eventually crosses U.S. Route 95 and intersects with an HOV ramp completed in 2019, serving as an entrance to US 95 south and an exit from US 95 north. The road continues west from there through residential areas and past farms and ranches before intersecting Decatur Boulevard and entering North Las Vegas city limits. The road runs through North Las Vegas and for 2 miles and passes through the Aliante community and the Aliante Casino and Hotel before ending at a dead end. From the dead end, Elkhorn Road will be extended to the soon-to-be extended Clayton Street.

Major intersections

Places along Elkhorn Road
The following lists are in order of west-east location along Elkhorn Road.

Buildings
 Aliante Casino and Hotel

Parks
 Promenade Park (at western terminus of Elkhorn Road)
 Winding Trails Park
 Mountain Ridge Park (access via Grand Montecito Parkway)
 Centennial Hills Park (access via Buffalo Drive)
 Aliante Golf Club

References

Streets in Las Vegas
Streets in the Las Vegas Valley
Streets in North Las Vegas, Nevada